John Rollins (March 23, 1806–May 7, 1883) was an American lumberman, steamboat operator, and politician who served in the Minnesota Territorial Council from 1849 until 1852 and again for the 1856 session.

Biography 
Rollins was born in New Sharon, Maine, on March 23, 1806. He was one of the first pioneers of Saint Anthony Falls, now a part of Minneapolis, first arriving in 1848. He was active in the lumber industry and operated a steamboat around the falls. 

Rollins was elected a member of the Minnesota Territorial Council when the Minnesota Territory was created. Rollins attended the first Minnesota Democratic Party convention on October 20, 1849. He served during the first two sessions.

Following his first stint in the Territorial Council, Rollins was involved in the construction of Minnesota roads, including one from Saint Anthony Falls to Taylors Falls. This road involved a stretch of the Point Douglas to Superior Military Road through the current Wild River State Park.

Rollins was elected to serve in the Territorial Council again but could not complete his second term, resigning on January 6, 1857. William W. Wales succeeded him. Rollins died in Minneapolis on May 7, 1883.

References

External links 
Biography at Minnesota Legislature

1806 births
1883 deaths
Members of the Minnesota Territorial Legislature
People from New Sharon, Maine
People from Minneapolis